Cape Deceit is a cape in Alaska. It is located in the Seward Peninsula on the Chukchi Sea coast.

Cape Deceit extends into Kotzebue Sound, 2 mi. NW of Deering; Kotzebue-Kobuk Low. 

This cape's name was given in 1816 by Lt. Otto von Kotzebue. "Deceit" is a translation of the German "Betrug,"  for Kotzebue thought that there was something about the shape of the cape and its surroundings that indicated a bay that did not exist. Thus he declared it to be "deceitful".  

The Inuit name of this cape has not been reported.

The Eastern Beringian vole, Microtus deceitensis, has been named after Cape Deceit.

References

 Cape Deceit vole:  & 
 Bird life at Cape Deceit: 

Deceit
Landforms of Northwest Arctic Borough, Alaska